Feylinia currori, also known commonly as Curror's skink, the western forest feylinia, and the western forest limbless skink, is a species of lizard in the family Scincidae.  The species is indigenous to Central Africa.

Etymology
The specific name, currori, is in honor of J. Curror of the Royal Navy, who presented the holotype to John Edward Gray.

Geographic range
F. currori is found in northern Angola (including Cabinda Province), Cameroon, Central African Republic, Democratic Republic of the Congo, Republic of Congo, Gabon, Kenya, Nigeria, and Tanzania.

Habitat

Description

Diet
F. currori predominately preys upon termites.

Reproduction
The mode of reproduction of F. currori is uncertain. It has reported to be oviparous and viviparous.

Taxonomy
F. currori is the type species of the genus Feylinia.

References

Further reading
Gray JE (1845). Catalogue of the Specimens of Lizards in the Collection of the British Museum. London: Trustees of the British Museum. (Edward Newman, printer). xxviii + 289 pp. (Feylinia currori, new species, p. 129).
Jackson K (2002). "Unusual colour variation in the legless skink, Feylinia currori (Scincidae: Feylininae)". African Herp News (35): 5–7.
Trape J-F, Trape S, Chirio L (2012). Lézards, crocodiles et tortues d'Afrique occidentale et du Sahara. Paris: IRD Orstom. 503 pp. . (in French).
Wagner P, Schmitz A (2006). "Feylinia currori Gray, 1845 (Squamata: Scincidae): new distribution records from Kenya". Salamandra 42 (2–3): 183–186.

Feylinia
Skinks of Africa
Reptiles of Angola
Reptiles of Cameroon
Reptiles of the Central African Republic
Reptiles of the Democratic Republic of the Congo
Reptiles of Gabon
Reptiles of Kenya
Reptiles of Nigeria
Reptiles of Tanzania
Taxa named by John Edward Gray
Reptiles described in 1845